Princess Ana Gruzinskaya Tolstaya (1798–1889) was a Georgian royal princess (batonishvili) of the Bagrationi dynasty.

Princess Ana was born on 31 January 1798 in Moscow to Prince Georgy Gruzinsky and Varvara Nikolayevna Bakhmetev.

Princess Ana married Prince Alexander Petrovych Tolstoy (1801-1873) but had no children.

According to a lady-in-waiting of the Russian imperial house Alexandra Smirnova:

She died in Moscow on 17 July 1889.

References

1798 births
1889 deaths
House of Mukhrani
Princesses from Georgia (country)
18th-century people from Georgia (country)
19th-century people from Georgia (country)
Ana Gruzinsky
Russian princesses
19th-century women from Georgia (country)
18th-century women from Georgia (country)